OHF may refer to:

 Olympus Has Fallen, a 2013 American action-thriller film
 Oceania Handball Federation, the administrative and controlling body for Oceanian team handball
 Omsk hemorrhagic fever, a viral hemorrhagic fever caused by a Flavivirus
 One Hour Photo, a 2002 American psychological thriller film
 Ontario Hockey Federation, a governing body of ice hockey in the province of Ontario
 Open hearth furnace, a kind of furnace for producing steel
Opinbert hlutafélag (ohf.), a form of government-owned corporation in Iceland